Charles Clément Balvay (23 May 1756, Paris – 23 March 1822, Paris), known as Bervic, was a French engraver mainly working in intaglio and exclusively in burin. Due to an error in transcribing the baptismal register, he is also now known as Jean Guillaume Balvay.

He served his first apprenticeship under Jean-Baptiste Le Prince, then left aged 14 for the studio of the engraver Jean-Georges Wille. When he was 18, he won first prize for drawing at the Académie royale de peinture et de sculpture, of which he was elected a member in 1784. He became a member of the Classe de Beaux-Arts (Fine Arts Section) of the Institut Impérial de France in 1803 and authored the chapter on engraving for the Institut's reports to the Emperor in 1808 on the progress of the arts, literature and sciences since 1789. He won many prizes and his drawing talents were particularly appreciated.

In 1809, Balvay was elected an associate member, fourth class, of the Royal Institute of the Netherlands, predecessor to the Royal Netherlands Academy of Arts and Sciences.

Balvay married the painter Marie-Marguerite Carreaux de Rosemond in 1788, but she died later that year. In 1791 he remarried to Marie-Madeleine Bligny, who died in 1795.<ref>Profile of Marie-Marguerite Carreaux de Rosemond at the Dictionary of Pastellists Before 1800.</ref>

WorksGabriel Senac de Meilhan (1783) after Joseph Siffred DuplessisLouis XVI (1790) after Antoine-François CalletSaint John in the desert after RaphaelThe Education of Achilles after Jean-Baptiste RegnaultThe Declaration after Louis Rolland TrinquesseThe Oath after Louis Rolland TrinquesseLe Laocoon'', after the classical sculpture, from a drawing by Pierre Bouillion, issued in Le Musée français, 1812.

References

1756 births
1822 deaths
18th-century engravers
19th-century engravers
French engravers
Members of the Académie des beaux-arts
Members of the Royal Netherlands Academy of Arts and Sciences